Russell Springs is a home rule-class city in Russell County, Kentucky, in the United States. The city is the gateway to Lake Cumberland, one of the largest man-made lakes in the region, created by Wolf Creek Dam. It is the largest city in the county, having a population of 2,441 during the year 2010 U.S. Census.

History
The present city grew out of a resort centered on a local chalybeate spring. Rennick relates that Samuel Patterson was generally credited with settling the site and that the community was known as Big Boiling Springs by 1850. The post office was established in 1855 as "Russell Springs" after the county, but was discontinued in 1865 and reopened as Kimble (after local businessman George Kimble) in 1888. The community restored the name Russell Springs in 1901 and incorporated in 1936.

Geography
Russell Springs is located at  (37.054853, -85.081162).

Russell Springs is situated in a hilly area in western Russell County, a few miles north of Lake Cumberland (part of the Cumberland River).  The city's historic district is concentrated along Kentucky Route 379 (Main Street) at its intersection with Jamestown Street. The city of Jamestown lies just to the south. U.S. Route 127 passes through the eastern part of the Russell Springs, connecting it with the Lake Cumberland area and Tennessee to the south, and the city of Liberty to the northeast.  The Cumberland Parkway also traverses Russell Springs, connecting it with Columbia to the west and Somerset to the east.

Demographics

As of the census of 2000, there were 2,399 people, 1,157 households, and 673 families residing in the city. The racial makeup of the city was 98.79% White, 0.17% African American, 0.13% Native American, 0.46% Asian, 0.04% Pacific Islander, 0.08% from other races, and 0.33% from two or more races. Hispanic or Latino of any race were 0.63% of the population.

There were 1,157 households, out of which 22.8% had children under the age of 18 living with them, 41.9% were married couples living together, 12.5% had a female householder with no husband present, and 41.8% were non-families. 38.4% of all households were made up of individuals, and 20.9% had someone living alone who was 65 years of age or older. The average household size was 2.06 and the average family size was 2.71.

The age distribution was 20.0% under the age of 18, 7.1% from 18 to 24, 25.2% from 25 to 44, 24.3% from 45 to 64, and 23.5% who were 65 years of age or older. The median age was 44 years. For every 100 females, there were 77.8 males. For every 100 females age 18 and over, there were 73.9 males.

The median income for a household in the city was $18,600, and the median income for a family was $26,464. Males had a median income of $23,480 versus $14,508 for females. The per capita income for the city was $14,660. About 21.8% of families and 27.7% of the population were below the poverty line, including 45.7% of those under age 18 and 24.8% of those age 65 or over.

Education
Russell Springs has a lending library, a branch of the Russell County Public Library.

Notable people

 Tara Conner, Miss Kentucky USA 2006, Miss USA 2006
 Vernie McGaha, Former Kentucky State Senator
 Doug Moseley, later a Kentucky state senator, was pastor of the Russell Springs First United Methodist Church from 1958 to 1960
 Steve Wariner, country music singer and songwriter. Kentucky State Route 80 is named in his honor.

References

External links

 Lake Cumberland Area Guide

Cities in Kentucky
Cities in Russell County, Kentucky